Tight is the debut studio album by the American rock band Mindless Self Indulgence. The album was originally released on April 20, 1999 through Uppity Cracker Recording Group. After having been out of print for many years, the album was reissued as Tighter on April 26, 2011 through The End Records. The reissue features updated artwork and packaging, 12 previously unreleased tracks, and a bonus DVD.

The song "Bring the Pain" is a cover of a Method Man song from his album Tical. The song "Bite Your Rhymes" references lyrics from Vanilla Ice's "Ice Ice Baby". There is a hidden track, "JX-47", where guitarist Steve plays acoustic guitar and sings nonsensical lyrics. The tracks "Mindless Self Indulgence" and "Ecnegludni Fles Sseldnim" are messages from the band's answering machine. They both concern getting the band booked for a live show, but both times the caller (Octavio 9) couldn't remember the band's name.

On April 20, 2008, the band posted "Tight", in its entirety, on their MySpace page in honor of its ninth year from the original release.

Track listing

DVD track listing
 "Bring the Pain" (Paramount Theatre – Seattle, WA 06/17/99)
 "Bring the Pain" (Backstage @ Paramount Theatre – Seattle, WA 06/17/99)
 "Daddy" (Squeezebox – New York, NY 02/06/98)
 "Daddy" (Rehearsal – New York, NY 09/29/99)
 "Diabolical" (Shrine Auditorium – Los Angeles, CA 06/23/99)
 "Dickface" (Bowery – New York, NY 09/07/99)
 "Dickface" (Brownies – New York, NY 01/20/99)
 "Grab the Mic" (Coney Island High – New York, NY 10/02/98)
 "Grab the Mic" (Subculture – Grand Rapids, MI 06/09/99)
 "Grab the Mic" (The Frying Pan – New York, NY 03/21/97)
 "Grab the Mic" (Virgin Megastore – New York, NY 04/20/99)
 "Molly" (Coney Island High – New York, NY 10/02/98)
 "Molly" (Fillmore Auditorium – Denver, CO 06/14/99)
 "Pussy All Night" (Brownies – New York, NY 01/20/99)
 "Pussy All Night" (CBGB's – New York, NY 11/11/99)
 "Pussy All Night" (Maritime Hall – San Francisco, CA 06/20/99)
 "Pussy All Night" (Shrine Auditorium – Los Angeles, CA 06/23/99)
 "Tight" (Fort Wayne Coliseum – Fort Wayne, IN 07/15/99)
 "Tight" (Maritime Hall – San Francisco, CA 06/20/99)
 "Tight" (Subculture – Grand Rapids, MI 06/09/99)
 "Tight" (Paramount Theatre – Seattle, WA 06/17/99)
 "Tight" (Virgin Megastore – New York, NY 04/20/99)
 "Tornado" (Fort Wayne Coliseum – Fort Wayne, IN 07/15/11)
Extras
 MSI Sux
 We Hate You 2
 Audio commentary

Personnel
Album personnel as adapted from the Allmusic entry for Tighter.

Mindless Self Indulgence
 Jimmy Urine – vocals, programming
 Steve, Righ? – guitars
 Kitty – drums
 Vanessa Y.T. – bass

Artwork and packaging
 Jennifer Dunn – layout, photography
 Billy French – layout
 James Galus – art direction, package design, photography
 Chris Greer – authoring
 Jorden Haley – logo
 Scott Marchfeld – authoring
 Stephanie Rauber – photography
 Jimmy Urine – art direction, package design

Production and recording
 Neil Beck – assistant engineer
 Dan the Man – assistant engineer
 James Galus – A&R, arranger, producer
 Ben Grassini – assistant engineer
 Andreas Katsambas – A&R
 Fred Mahr – engineer, mixing
 John Partham – engineer
 Lloyd Puckitt – engineer, mixing
 Marke Reed – compilation, editing
 Greg Reely – mastering, mixing
 Steve Revitte – assistant engineer
 Jimmy Urine – arranger, compilation, editing, engineer, mixing, producer
 Richard Zabala – assistant engineer

References

Mindless Self Indulgence albums
1999 debut albums